Real Bella Vista F.C. is a Honduran football club, based in Limón, Honduras.

History
They were relegated to Liga Mayor after the 2007/2008 season.

References

Football clubs in Honduras